San Fedele may refer to:

Churches 
San Fedele, Milan, a church in Milan, Lombardy, Italy
San Fedele, Poggiridenti, a church in Poggiridenti, Lombardy, Italy
Basilica of San Fedele, Como, a basilica church in Como, Lombardy, Italy

People 
Fidelis of Como, saint

Places 
San Fedele, Albenga, a village in the province of Savona, Liguria, Italy
San Fedele, Radda in Chianti, a village in the province of Siena, Tuscany, Italy
San Fedele Intelvi, a village in the province of Como, Lombardy, Italy